Subish Sudhi, professionally credited as Subeesh Sudhi, is a Malayalam film actor from Payyanur, Kannur, Kerala.

Personal life

After finishing his studies he moved to Ernakulam to achieve his dream to act in movies. He got his first chance in the movie Classmates.

Career

He made his debut in Lal Jose's film named classmates 2006 As a student in the college. After that Lal Jose directed 12 movies and Subish is a part of 8 films out of 12, So he's basically known as actor of laljose.

Subish Sudhi started his career in the Malayalam film Classmates (2006 film), even though he got a good role in the film Lord Livingstone 7000 Kandi as a massive makeover as a tribal man.

Filmography

References

External links 
 
 Official Facebook

Male actors in Malayalam cinema
Indian male film actors
Living people
Male actors from Kochi
21st-century Indian male actors
Film directors from Kochi
Malayalam film directors
1985 births